Parliamentary elections were held in Vietnam on 19 July 1992. The Vietnamese Fatherland Front was the only party to contest the election, although independent candidates were also allowed for the first time. While the VFF nominated 599 candidates (almost 90% of which were members of the Communist Party), there were only two independents. The VFF won all 395 seats.

Results

References

Vietnam
Elections in Vietnam
Legislative election
One-party elections
Election and referendum articles with incomplete results